Cradley is a village in the civil parish of Cradley and Storridge, in Herefordshire, England. The nearest towns are Ledbury,  to the south, and Bromyard,  to the north west, in Herefordshire and Malvern, Worcestershire,  to the south east on the other side of the Malvern Hills. Cradley and Storridge parish, including Storridge and Ridgeway Cross, had a population in 2011 of 1,667.

There are two villages named Cradley in the Midlands of England although the names are pronounced differently; the "other" Cradley being situated close to Halesowen.

Places of interest
St James Church. The chancel was added by Sir George Gilbert Scott in 1868.  Pevsner also mentions a mediaeval lychgate, a font dated 1722 and the remains of a previous carved font incorporated into a doorway in the tower.  Carved stones in the fabric of the church have been identified as dating from the Saxon period.

Cradley Village Hall is a 16th-century timbered building, which was renovated and restored after a serious fire destroyed a large part of the roof. It has 21st-century additions of meeting rooms, Heritage and village resource centre. The heritage archives and local group are available for those researching local history or genealogy. The resource centre has up to date computer and printing and copying services for village use.

Since the closure of the village shop/Post Office, a Post Office counter is manned in the village hall, two days a week, Monday morning and Thursday afternoon. All the usual Post office services are available.

Festival
2011 saw Cradley as the centre of the "Three Villages Festival", along with neighbours Storridge and Mathon. This event celebrated Village life in rural Herefordshire and in 2011 the theme was "Masquerade", an exploration of mask making and wearing.

References

External links

 Cradley and Storridge village information 
 Cradley Primary School
 Cradley - A Village History
 GENUKI for Cradley
 Cradley Village Hall
 Cradley Parish Council
 Cradley Mathon & Storridge annual festival( 3Villages Festival)
 Diary of events in Cradley, Mathon and Storridge
 St James the great Church Cradley
 Cradley Mathon and Storridge local mart and information on local businesses and groups 

Villages in Herefordshire